The  is an archaeological site consisting of a series of large shell middens and the remains of an adjacent settlement from the Jōmon period. The site is in what is now part of the city of Hakodate in Oshima Subprefecture on the island of Hokkaido in northern Japan. It has been protected by the central government as a Historic Site since 7 February 2011.

Early history

The Kakinoshima site was a community with several pit dwellings, including smaller family homes and some larger homes that were inhabited from 7000 BC to 1000 BC. The dates of the site's habitation correspond to the early, middle, and late subsections of the Jōmon period of Japanese history. The community was positioned on a marine terrace alongside the Pacific Ocean where two large earthen mounds were built by the inhabitants of the site. Artifacts found within the site include tablets with footprints that were found in a burial pit, a piece of jade jewelry, and 9,000 year old red lacquerware that are the oldest known pieces of lacquerware in the world.

Modern history
The Kakinoshima site was discovered during surveying work in 2000. Initial discoveries included a large pit dwelling and a burial site for the occupants of the community. The site was placed under the protection of the central government as a Historic Site on 7 February 2011. As of July 2019, less than 2 percent of the archaeological site had been excavated.

The submission currently resides on the Tentative List, with the decision to be included in the list to be announced in May 2021.

See also
 Hakodate Jōmon Culture Center
 List of Historic Sites of Japan (Hokkaido)

References

Archaeological sites in Japan
History of Hokkaido
Jōmon period
Archaeological parks
Hakodate